The 2021–22 UCLA Bruins women's basketball team represented the University of California, Los Angeles during the 2021–22 NCAA Division I women's basketball season. The Bruins were led by eleventh-year head coach Cori Close. They played their home games at Pauley Pavilion and competed as members of the Pac-12 Conference.

The Bruins were invited to the WNIT as the automatic qualifier for the Pac-12 Conference. It was the Bruins' first WNIT appearance since 2015, when they were WNIT champions.

Previous season 
The Bruins finished the season 17–6, 12–4 in Pac-12 play to finish in third place. As the third seed in the Pac-12 women's tournament they advanced to the championship game where they lost to Stanford. As a three seed in the NCAA tournament, the Bruins managed to beat Wyoming in the 1st round, but then they lost to Texas in the second round to end their season.

Offseason

Departures
Due to COVID-19 disruptions throughout NCAA sports in 2020–21, the NCAA announced that the 2020–21 season would not count against the athletic eligibility of any individual involved in an NCAA winter sport, including women's basketball. This meant that all seniors in 2020–21 had the option to return for 2021–22.

Incoming transfers

Preseason
 October 12, 2021 – The Bruins were picked to finish third in both the 2021-22 Pac-12 Preseason Media and Coaches Polls, behind Stanford and Oregon
 October 25, 2021 – Gina Conti was named to the Nancy Lieberman Award top 20 watch list (Top point guard)
 October 26, 2021 – Charisma Osborne was named to the Ann Meyers Drysdale Award top 20 watch list (Best shooting guard)
 November 3, 2021 – Preseason All-Pac-12 team: Charisma Osborne; Gina Conti and Natalie Chou (Honorable mention)
 November 9, 2021 – Charisma Osborne was named to three watch lists (Wade Trophy, Wooden Award, and Naismith Trophy)

Roster

Schedule

|-
!colspan=9 style=| Regular Season

|-
!colspan=9 style=| 

|-
!colspan=12 style=| 

Source:

Rankings

*The preseason and week 1 polls were the same.^Coaches did not release a week 2 poll.

Awards and honors

 January 5, 2022 – Charisma Osborne named to the mid-season top 25 John R. Wooden Award watch list
 January 31, 2022 – Charisma Osborne was named to the John R. Wooden Award's late season top 20 watch list
 February 8, 2022 – Charisma Osborne was selected to the Ann Meyers-Drysdale Award top 10 watch list and to the Jersey Mike's Naismith Trophy midseason team
 April 4, 2022 – IImar'I Thomas named to the WNIT All-Tournament team

Statistics

Updated through February 26, 2022

Notes

References

UCLA
UCLA Bruins women's basketball
2021 in sports in California
2022 in sports in California
UCLA